Tatyana Andreyevna Roshchina-Osipova (Татьяна Андреевна Рощина-Осипова; born 23 September 1987 in Kokshetau, Akmola) is a Kazakhstani cross-country skier who has been competing since 2004. At the 2010 Winter Olympics in Vancouver, she finished tenth in the 4 × 5 km relay and 36th in the 10 km event.

Osipova's best finish at the FIS Nordic World Ski Championships was 11th in the 4 × 5 km relay at Liberec in 2009. Her best individual finish was 45th in the 7.5 km + 7.5 km double pursuit at those same championships.

Osipova's best World Cup finish was eighth in a 4 × 5 km relay at Norway in 2009 while her best individual finish was 57th in a 15 km mass start event at France in 2008.

In marriage she bears the name Osipova. Her husband is the Kazakhstani cross-country skier Alexander Osipov.

References

External links
 Tatyana Roshchina-Osipova - 2014 Olympic results at Sports Reference
 Tatyana Roshchina - 2010 Olympic results at Sports Reference

1987 births
Living people
Sportspeople from Kokshetau
Kazakhstani female cross-country skiers
Tour de Ski skiers
Cross-country skiers at the 2010 Winter Olympics
Cross-country skiers at the 2014 Winter Olympics
Olympic cross-country skiers of Kazakhstan
Universiade medalists in cross-country skiing
Universiade bronze medalists for Kazakhstan
Competitors at the 2013 Winter Universiade
Competitors at the 2015 Winter Universiade
21st-century Kazakhstani women